This article describes some of the institutions and agencies contributing to the development and practice of ergonomics in Canada.

Ergonomics (from the Greek ἔργον, meaning ‘work’, and νόμος, meaning ‘natural law’) is the study of the relation between a person (the operator) and the means used by the operator to perform a task.
The task may be (and in the early days of the discipline was restricted to) an industrial or occupational task, like operating a lathe or driving a vehicle or (since those early days) monitoring a computer-controlled operation, but it may also take the form of playing a sport, pursuing a hobby, or conducting an everyday task such as crossing a street.
The means used may vary accordingly, from a lathe or car or operator-computer interface to running shoes or bird-watching binoculars or a pedestrian-crossing signal.
In studying the relation between operators and tasks, ergonomists take account of the perceptual and problem-solving skills required of the operator, the physiological and anatomical characteristics of the operator, and the organisational, managerial, and social context within which the task is performed.
The knowledge thus acquired is applied to the design of the means of performing the task and the context in which it is performed in such a way as to maintain the health and well-being of the operator while at the same time maximising the effectiveness and efficiency of the operation.

Defence Research Board Toronto
Ergonomics in Canada, as in other countries, found its genesis in military procurement. Following the Second World War, military scientists at the Defence Research Board Toronto recognised the basic tenet of ergonomics – that operators (in this case service personnel) work more safely and more effectively when the design of the work situation takes account of their anatomical, physiological and psychological characteristics – and adopted ergonomics as a significant component of their work. In due course (after a change of name to Defence Research Establishment Toronto), DRET became the birthplace, in 1968, of the Association of Canadian Ergonomists, the Canadian organisation affiliated to the International Ergonomics Association.

Apart from providing a birthplace for ACE, DRET also provided its original name: Human Factors Association of Canada. In establishing DRET, the Department of National Defence had "recognized the importance of human factors", and DRET claimed "the human factors of command systems" as one of its areas of competence. In 1968, prevailing opinion in North America was that the term 'human factors' correctly described the domain of interest and did so more appropriately than the term 'ergonomics'. The new association was therefore named accordingly. It thrived for many years with that name but whether the decision impeded, in certain respects, the development of ergonomics in Canada remains questionable.

Association of Canadian Ergonomists
The twenty-nine founding members of the original organisation were mostly military or ex-military persons or functionaries of other government departments. A few were academics; only two were women. In its early days the Association (HFAC, as it then was) members met at least once a year to present papers to each other, but it did not engage seriously in questions of academic and professional status and development. The prevailing mode changed in 1981 when members were persuaded to forsake the Muskoka Lakes in order to hold the annual conference in Toronto. Ergonomists from places outside southern Ontario were now able to find the venue and the organisation began its expansion.

In 1984 the Association adopted the name Human Factors Association of Canada/Association canadienne d’ergonomie. In this year also it entered the international scene by sponsoring the International Conference on Occupational Ergonomics in Toronto. In 1999 it changed its name once more, this time to the Association of Canadian Ergonomists/Association canadienne d’ergonomie (ACE).

Institut de récherche en santé et en sécurité du travail     
Meanwhile, parallel developments were taking place in Montreal. In 1980 the Government of Quebec had established the Institut de recherche en santé et en sécurité de travail (IRSST) to undertake research aimed at promoting occupational health and safety. From its inception, ergonomics research constituted a significant part of the activity of IRSST, but unlike that of the Defence and Civil Institute of Environmental Medicine (the successor of DRET), this research was wholly directed to industrial objectives as distinct from what were the mostly military objectives of the latter. 

IRSST was also distinctive in having representatives of employer organisations and trade unions sitting on its administrative board. In other respects, the two agencies were alike in being government sponsored and, for the most part, government funded, and in giving considerable support to the professional and scientific activities of ACE.

Associate Committee for the Occupational Applications of Ergonomics
In 1984 the National Research Council of Canada established the Associate Committee for the Occupational Applications of Ergonomics. Drawing members from government agencies, the universities, industry and commerce, and trade unions, the Associate Committee was mandated to promote the application of ergonomics to industry on the assumption that this either was not, or was inadequately, being done already. Committee members set out across Canada to bring the message to workers, managers and employers, with diverse results. In one city two hundred persons attended a one-day workshop sponsored by the Committee while in another barely a dozen turned up. In these workshops the speakers endeavoured to stress the broad scope of ergonomics, pointing out that ergonomics was pertinent not only to occupational health and safety but also to efficiency and effectiveness.

The Associate Committee sponsored surveys and seminars implicating government occupational health and safety agencies, ergonomics teachers, trade unions and ACE and successfully raised awareness of the issues. It tried equally to implicate industrialists and engineers but with mixed results. The Committee succeeded in co-sponsoring (with ACE) the appointment of an industry technical advisor by the NRC Industrial Research Assistance Program but failed to persuade the Natural Sciences and Engineering Research Council of Canada to establish a grants committee for ergonomics. 

As a legacy, the Committee left a series of useful publications.

University departments
Of the institutions that have played a role in developing ergonomics in Canada, the universities are the ones whose contribution has been most ambivalent. Ergonomics has been taught as a university subject for many years, but in a variety of departments ranging from kinesiology, psychology and biological sciences to industrial relations, industrial engineering, systems engineering and other engineering disciplines. This has had the benefit of bringing to the teaching of ergonomics the full range of knowledge and techniques that the subject calls for, but it has led to some disarray. Ergonomics is compelled, in many cases, to occupy the minor role in a department named for and devoted to some other discipline, and what students receive has been shaped accordingly. No Canadian university has a dedicated Department of Ergonomics.

This lack of cohesion is reflected today in the attitudes of managers, trade unionists, and members of the public in general towards ergonomics. For example, the introduction of information technology into the workplace has led to changes in workplace structure and procedures that call for the application of ergonomics theory and technique. But ergonomics has become associated with the single issue of avoiding repetitive-strain injuries. The topic of man- or (more properly) operator-machine interface has become a hardy perennial at all conferences designed for computer engineers and computer scientists, but it has assumed a life of its own divorced from a more comprehensive ergonomic approach.

Canadian College for the Certification of Professional Ergonomists
The eventual outcome of this state of affairs remains to be seen. With universities interested more in areas of application (like women's studies, aboriginal studies, environmental studies, management studies) rather than basic disciplines, little relief is likely to come from that area. On the other hand, in 1998, after years of preparation, ACE established the Canadian College for the Certification of Professional Ergonomists/Conseil Canadien de certification des praticiens en ergonomie with a current (2021) membership of more than 260 certified professional ergonomists. Strong professional associations like ACE and CCCPE may make the difference.

See also
 Human factors and ergonomics

References

External links
 Association of Canadian Ergonomists
 Canadian College for the Certification of Professional Ergonomists

Ergonomics
Health in Canada